Petersdorf is a village and a former municipality in the Mecklenburgische Seenplatte district, in Mecklenburg-Vorpommern, Germany. Since May 2019, it is part of the town Woldegk.

References 

Grand Duchy of Mecklenburg-Strelitz
Former municipalities in Mecklenburg-Western Pomerania